Mount Zion is a hill in Jerusalem.

Mount Zion may also refer to:

Places

Canada
Mount Zion, Quinte West, Ontario

United States
 Mount Zion (Colorado), a mountain
 Mount Zion, Georgia
 Mount Zion, Illinois
 Mount Zion Township, Macon County, Illinois
 Mount Zion, Indiana
 Mount Zion, Fulton County, Indiana
 Mount Zion, Kentucky
 Mount Zion, Red River Parish, Louisiana
 Mount Zion, Missouri
 Mount Zion (New York), a mountain
 Mount Zion, Wisconsin
 Mount Zion (Washington), a mountain 
 Mount Zion, West Virginia

Buildings and institutions

Religion
 Mount Zion African Methodist Episcopal Church (disambiguation)
 Mount Zion Baptist Church (disambiguation)
 Mount Zion Cemetery (disambiguation)
 Mount Zion Church (disambiguation)
 Mount Zion Memorial Church, Somerset County, Maryland, U.S., a historic church
 Mount Zion Methodist Church (disambiguation)
 Mount Zion Presbyterian Church (disambiguation)
 Mount Zion United Methodist Church (disambiguation)
 Mount Zion Temple, in St Paul, Minnesota, U.S., a synagogue 
 Mount Zion United Methodist Church, in Longdale, Mississippi, U.S., associated with the 1964 murders of Chaney, Goodman, and Schwerner

Education
 Mount Zion Christian Academy, Durham, North Carolina, U.S., a high school
 Mount Zion Christian Schools (Manchester, New Hampshire), U.S.
 Mount Zion College of Engineering, Kadammanitta, Kerala, India
 Mount Zion College of Engineering and Technology, Pudukkottai, Tamil Nadu, India
 Mount Zion High School (disambiguation)
 Mount Zion One Room School, in Snow Hill, Maryland, U.S., a historic school 
 Mt. Zion Schoolhouse, Mount Solon, Augusta County, Virginia, U.S., a historic public school building

Other buildings and institutions
 Mount Zion (Milldale, Virginia), U.S., a historic home
 Mount Zion Hospital, UCSF Medical Center, in  San Francisco, California, U.S.
 Mount Zion Memorial Fund, an American non-profit corporation

Other uses
 Mt. Zion (film), a 2013 New Zealand film 
 Mount Zion Award, awarded by the Institute for Jewish-Christian Research at the University of Lucerne in Switzerland

See also

Zion Hill (disambiguation)
Har-Zion (disambiguation)
 Zion (disambiguation)
 Thee Silver Mt. Zion Memorial Orchestra, a Canadian band